Khatti is a village near Khurampur, Tehsil Phagwara, Kapurthala district, in Punjab, India.

Demographics
According to the 2001 Census, Khatti had a population of 917 people. Neighbouring villages include Sr Hargobindgarh, Dhadday, Chak Prema, Gulabgarh, Wariah, Khurampur and Palahi. The nearest police station is at Rawal Pindi.

Mandir of Lord Parashurama
Khatti is famous for the Mandir of Lord Parashurama and as such there is a movement to declare Khatti a heritage village.

The Jayanti of Lord Parashurama is celebrated at the Mandir every year and is a big attraction.

References

Villages in Kapurthala district